Félix Eliud Zeledón Zeledón (born November 24, 1983) is a Nicaraguan footballer who plays for Real Estelí in the Primera División de Nicaragua.

Club career
He joined VCP Chinandega from hometown club Real Estelí in summer 2009, but returned to Estelí a half year later.

International career
Zeledón made his debut for Nicaragua in a January 2009 UNCAF Nations Cup match against El Salvador and has, as of December 2013, earned a total of 24 caps, scoring 1 goal. He has represented his country in 4 FIFA World Cup qualification matches and played at the 2009, 2011 and 2013 UNCAF Nations Cupss as well as at the 2009 CONCACAF Gold Cup.

International goals
Scores and results list Nicaragua's goal tally first.

References

External links 
 

1983 births
Living people
People from Estelí Department
Association football defenders
Nicaraguan men's footballers
Nicaragua international footballers
2009 UNCAF Nations Cup players
2009 CONCACAF Gold Cup players
2011 Copa Centroamericana players
2013 Copa Centroamericana players
Real Estelí F.C. players